Abu al-Hasan Ali ibn Mohammed ibn al-Qattan al-Fasi (died 1231) was an imam, a hadith scholar and one of the leading intellectuals of the time of the Almohad dynasty. He was born in Cordoba and lived in Fes. He is the author of Kitab al-nazar fi ahkam al-nazar bi-hassat al-basar and Bayan al-Wahm wa al-iham al-waqi'in fi kitab al-ahkam.

References

Hadith scholars
1231 deaths
People from Córdoba, Spain
Year of birth unknown
13th-century jurists
Almohad scholars